András Balczó (born 16 August 1938) is a retired Hungarian modern pentathlete. He competed at the 1960, 1968 and 1972 Olympics in the individual and team events and won three gold and two silver medal; he missed only one medal, finishing fourth individually in 1960.

Balczó was elected Hungarian Sportsman of the Year 1966, 1969 and 1972, while the pentathlon team was several times chosen as the Hungarian Team of the Year. He was awarded the title of Merited Master of Sport of the USSR in 1972, along with eight other athletes from outside USSR.

He is considered one of the most successful athletes in the history of modern pentathlon. His wife Mónika Császár is a former Olympic gymnast.

References

External links

1938 births
Living people
Sportspeople from Békés County
Hungarian male modern pentathletes
Olympic modern pentathletes of Hungary
Modern pentathletes at the 1960 Summer Olympics
Modern pentathletes at the 1968 Summer Olympics
Modern pentathletes at the 1972 Summer Olympics
Olympic gold medalists for Hungary
Olympic silver medalists for Hungary
Olympic medalists in modern pentathlon
Honoured Masters of Sport of the USSR
World Modern Pentathlon Championships medalists
Medalists at the 1972 Summer Olympics
Medalists at the 1968 Summer Olympics
Medalists at the 1960 Summer Olympics